U.S. Highway 1 (US 1) is a  north–south U.S. Highway that crosses South Carolina from southwest to northeast and connects the cities of North Augusta, Aiken, Lexington, Columbia, Camden, and Cheraw.

The route parallels Interstate 20 (I-20) closely from the Georgia border to Camden, where I-20 turns to a more directly easterly direction. From Camden to the North Carolina border, US 1 is the highest capacity route through much of the Sandhills region.

Route description

US 1 enters South Carolina in North Augusta, along an expressway with US 25, US 78, and US 278 on a bridge over the Savannah River from Augusta, Georgia. South Carolina Highway 121 (SC 121) also begins at the state border. The expressway is known locally as the Jefferson Davis Highway. At the second interchange (E. Martintown Road), US 25 and SC 121 leave the expressway. After several at-grade intersections, there is an interchange with I-520, and the route bypasses the Aiken County communities of Clearwater (where US 278 leaves the concurrency), Burnettown, and Gloverville. Upon entering the city of Aiken, the three concurrent routes transition to a boulevard with a center turn and turns from a northeasterly direction to a more directly eastbound direction. This area is heavily developed, with shopping centers and subdivision entrances along both sides of the road. The road is known locally as Augusta–Aiken Road. Reaching the historic central area of Aiken, the route turns to a divided road again as the name changes to Richland Avenue, and the route becomes heavily residential with a wide, tree-lined median down the middle. US 1 leaves Richland Avenue and US 78 to turn north on York Street.

York Street is a four-lane boulevard until it meets Hampton Avenue, where it leaves the main grid of central Aiken and becomes a five-lane boulevard with a center turn lane through a light industrial area leading north out of the city. Leaving Aiken, it is known as the Columbia Highway and passes Aiken Regional Airport and an interchange with I-20 north of the city, after which the road narrows to a two-lane rural highway. It passes into Saluda County in Moneta, and then on through the town of Batesburg-Leesville as Columbia Avenue, where it gains a center turn lane. It meets the eastern terminus of SC 23 at the eastern edge of town and loses its center turn lane as the name changes to Augusta Highway. Passing through a large rural area, the road once again widens to a five-lane boulevard with a center turning lane as it approaches Lexington.

Entering Lexington, the road merges with US 378 along West Main Street. US 378 then leaves West Main Street along Columbia Avenue. West Main Street changes to East Main Street at Lake Drive (SC 6 and changes names again to Augusta Road about  before a second interchange with I-20. US 1 passes east–west through the communities of Oak Grove and West Columbia before crossing the Congaree River along the Gervais Street Bridge. Shortly before the bridge US 378 merges once again with US 1.

After the river, US 1 goes through downtown Columbia along Gervais Street, passing directly in front of the South Carolina State House. At Millwood Avenue, US 1 turns northeast while US 378 leaves to the southeast on the same road. Crossing SC 12 (Taylor Street/Forest Drive), the name changes to Two Notch Road, named for when the road was marked by posts with two notches carved. Passing the Columbia Place shopping mall, it has a third interchange with I-20 and passes through several unincorporated Columbia suburbs in Richland County. An interchange with Clemson Road provides access to I-20 and to Fort Jackson.

Entering Kershaw County, US 1 merges with US 601 in Lugoff and, crossing the Wateree River, enters Camden along DeKalb Street. US 601 leaves at the center of Camden. From Camden, it continues northeast as a two-lane road through several small towns of the Sandhills region, merging with US 52 between Cheraw State Park and the town of south of Cheraw. Within Cheraw, it follows Market Street (where SC 9 joins) then Second Street and turns onto Powe Street (while US 52 continues on Second Street). US 1 turns north on its own routing while SC 9 continues west.

The entire route is part of the Jefferson Davis Highway, named after Civil War Confederate leader Jefferson Davis; with exception between North Augusta and Aiken, where US 1 was realigned, leaving SC 421 its section of the highway name.  Markers of the highway dot all along the route, though most sections do have other road names too.

History

US 1 was established in 1927 as an original U.S. Highway. It traveled generally as it does now, overlapping with SC 12, from North Augusta to West Columbia, SC 2, from West Columbia to Columbia, and SC 50, from Columbia to the North Carolina state line. The following year, both SC 12 and SC 50 were dropped along the route. The entire route was paved by 1932.

Around 1938, US 1 was rerouted between Cheraw and Wallace, going further north along its now current alignment and leaving behind Hickson Road (S-35-52) and Brickyard Road (S-35-36). The first section widen to four-lane was a  section north of Columbia, in 1940. Between 1940–1946, US 1 was rerouted in Columbia; originally using Gervais Street, Assembly Street, Taylor Street, and Two Notch Road, switching to Gervais Street, Harden Street, Taylor Street, and Two Notch Road. By 1952, US 1 was rerouted again in Columbia, switching to Gervais Street, Millwood Avenue, and Two Notch. Also by 1952, US 1/US 78 were given new alignment bypassing Clearwater, Bath, Langley, and Gloverville; the old alignment became SC 421. By 1957, US 1/US 78 was rerouted from the Fifth Street Bridge to its current alignment over the Savannah River.

Major intersections

See also
 
 
 Special routes of U.S. Route 1

References

External links

 
 US 1 at Virginia Highways' South Carolina Highways Annex

 South Carolina
01
Transportation in Aiken County, South Carolina
Transportation in Saluda County, South Carolina
Transportation in Lexington County, South Carolina
Transportation in Richland County, South Carolina
Transportation in Kershaw County, South Carolina
Transportation in Chesterfield County, South Carolina
Transportation in Marlboro County, South Carolina
North Augusta, South Carolina
Aiken, South Carolina
Transportation in Columbia, South Carolina
Camden, South Carolina